Aleksandar Simović (born 30 January 1992) is a Serbian football midfielder.

References

External links
 
 Aleksandar Simović stats at utakmica.rs 
 

1992 births
Living people
Footballers from Belgrade
Association football midfielders
Serbian footballers
FK BSK Borča players
Serbian SuperLiga players
Serbian expatriate footballers
Serbian expatriate sportspeople in Greece
Expatriate footballers in Greece